Sino-Ocean Taikoo Li Chengdu is a mixed-use development located in the Jinjiang District of Chengdu, near the Chunxi Road shopping district. It is a large-scale development of over 2.86 million sq ft (over 265,000 m2) and consists of an open air, 'lane-driven' mall, a boutique hotel The Temple House with 100 guest rooms and 42 serviced apartments, and a Grade-A office tower Pinnacle One.

Location
Sino-Ocean Taikoo Li Chengdu is located in the Jinjiang District, the city's core business and retail center, and is home to many international banks. The complex is accessible from the Chengdu Metro, and is served by Metro Lines 2 and 3 as well as the Chunxi Road interchange station. It is located next to the 1,600-year-old Daci Temple which was preserved as part of the construction.

History and construction
The center opened in April 2015, and features a pedestrianized precinct built around six restored heritage buildings including the Daci temple complex and Huguang Guild Hall. In keeping with Chengdu's heritage, the pedestrianized area contains both “slow lanes” for tea rooms, restaurants and boutiques, as well as “fast lanes” which contain major international brands such as Muji. Underneath the complex there are 1,000 parking spaces, direct metro access, as well as a cinema, a supermarket and a  Fangsuo bookstore. Following completion, the development was selected as a global winner in the 2015 Urban Land Institute Global Awards for Excellence competition. The shopping district brings together a range of top fashion and lifestyle brands such as Gucci, Cartier, Hermès, Ralph Lauren, Versace, Valentino, Thom Browne, Balmain, Givenchy, Acne Studios, I.T, Michael Kors, and B&O.

Gallery

References

Tourist attractions in Chengdu
Shopping malls in Chengdu
2015 establishments in China
Swire Group
Shopping malls established in 2015